John Roberts (born October 2, 1965) is a former on-air broadcaster for NASCAR coverage on Speed Channel, which later became Fox Sports 1. He  appeared on NASCAR Race Hub and NASCAR Live! and until 2014, he appeared on NASCAR RaceDay and NASCAR Victory Lane, while also having served as a substitute studio host for NASCAR on Fox in 2012. He currently hosts Tradin’ Paint on Sirius XM NASCAR Radio.

Career

His career started in 1986 at WHSV TV in Harrisonburg, Virginia. He then worked at WBTV in Charlotte before moving to the Fox Network-owned Speed Channel to host NASCAR RaceDay and NASCAR Victory Lane.

In 2012, Roberts was the interim studio host for the 2012 Daytona 500, filling in for Chris Myers, who was on bereavement leave due to the death of his son.

Following the Homestead 2018 edition of RaceDay, Roberts announced on Twitter that he would be retiring and that would be his last broadcast. Towards the end of his tenure at Fox, he hosted the Truck Series pre-race show from the NASCAR on Fox studio in Charlotte, where he was replaced by Kaitlyn Vincie in 2019, who previously had been a pit reporter for the Truck Series.

Since 2019, Roberts hosts Tradin’ Paint every weekday on Sirius XM NASCAR Radio from 1pm-3pm EST with Chocolate Myers.

Personal life
Roberts was born in Washington, D.C. He attended James Madison University.

References

1965 births
American television reporters and correspondents
Living people
James Madison University alumni
Motorsport announcers
People from Washington, D.C.
NASCAR people
American television sports announcers
Fox Sports 1 people